Postnik Yakovlev (Постник Яковлев) is most famous as one of the architects and builders of Saint Basil's Cathedral on Red Square in Moscow (built between 1555 and 1560, the other architect is Barma).  Originally from Pskov, it is thought that he was nicknamed "Barma" (Барма) ("the mumbler"), although it might be that his full name was, in fact, Ivan Yakovlevich Barma; (Postnik means "Faster", a term used for several religious figures, including Patriarch John IV of Constantinople); Barma might also be Yakovlev's assistant.

According to legend, Ivan the Terrible blinded Yakovlev so that he could never build anything so beautiful again. He also designed the northeast chapel of St. Basil's (where Basil himself, the popular Basil Fool for Christ – Yurodivy Vassily Blazhenny – is buried), in 1588, four years after Ivan's death.

According to several historians, Yakovlev also designed churches in Staritsa, Murom, Sviazhsk, and perhaps Vladimir, although others contend that this was another architect with a similar name.

References

Russian architects
16th-century architects
16th-century Russian people